Trond Nordsteien (born 24 November 1963) is a Norwegian football manager.

Nordsteien hails from Løkken Verk, moving to Trondheim at the age of 15. After playing on Rosenborg's junior team with Trond Henriksen, he was not good enough for the senior team. His senior career was instead spent with lowly SK Freidig. Nordsteien studied to become a mathematics teacher, and coached a boys' team in Othilienborg, then the junior team of Nardo FK.

After becoming runners-up in the 1997 Norwegian Junior Cup, Nordsteien took over Kolstad IL in 1998. In 1999 he took over the dominating women's team at the time, SK Trondheims-Ørn. With Trondheims-Ørn, Nordsteien won the Toppserien in 2000, 2001 and 2003; the cup in 2001 and 2002 and reached the 2004–05 UEFA Women's Cup semi-final.

In 2003 he was appointed as assistant manager of the Norway under-21 women's team, and a year later he advanced to assistant manager of Norway under Åge Steen. VG revealed that Nordsteien could continue as Trondheims-Ørn manager and assist the national team part-time, due to Football Association budget cuts for women's and youth teams after Åge Hareide was bought out of Rosenborg to coach the men's team.

Nonetheless, Nordsteien did not renew his contract with Trondheims-Ørn as it expired on 31 December 2005. He was hired as player developed in Rosenborg, succeeding Bjørn Hansen who retired. This entailed leaving the national team as well.

In 2011 he doubled as assistant manager of Ranheim. In 2012 he coached Norway U19, and became acting coach of Norway U21 in 2013.

He left Rosenborg after the 2012 season to become head coach in the Norwegian First Division. Nordsteien took over Ranheim in 2013, serving until he was sacked in May 2015. In 2016 he returned to Trondheims-Ørn, but already in June he announced his intention to leave the club, and was replaced in September. During the closing days of the 2017 season he was hired by Tromsø IL as a coach developer. He stayed throughout 2018 and was succeeded by Morten Giæver.

References

1963 births
Living people
People from Orkdal
People from Trondheim
Norwegian footballers
Norwegian football managers
Rosenborg BK non-playing staff
Ranheim Fotball managers
Tromsø IL non-playing staff